The 24th Genie Awards were held on May 1, 2004, to honour films released in 2003. The ceremony was hosted by Scott Thompson. The ceremony was broadcast on CHUM Limited's terrestrial Citytv and Access Alberta networks, as well as on the cable channels Bravo! and Star!.

Nominations were announced on March 16, 2004. The film Seducing Doctor Lewis garnered the most nominations with 11 nods, although it was virtually shut out on the night of the ceremony, winning only the award for Best Cinematography. Denys Arcand's The Barbarian Invasions was the night's big winner, winning six awards including Best Picture. Arcand joked, however, that he had won only because neither David Cronenberg nor Atom Egoyan had a film in competition.

Sarah Polley's Best Actress win for My Life Without Me was the only one of the six top awards not won by The Barbarian Invasions. Polley took the opportunity in her speech to lament the state of Canadian film: "We make great movies in this country and it's a shame that the Canadian public never gets to see them."

Nominees and winners

References

External links
Genie Awards 2004 at IMDb

24
Genie
Genie